Gaetano Castrovilli  (born 17 February 1997) is an Italian professional footballer who plays as midfielder for  club Fiorentina and the Italy national team.

Club career
Castrovilli initially started playing football with the Minervino football school. At the age of 11, he joined the Bari youth system. He went on to make his debut for the first team in Serie B in 2015, and later broke into the starting line-up under manager Roberto Stellone during the 2016–17 season, making 11 appearances for the club in total.

His performances caught the attention of Fiorentina, and he was later sent on loan to join the Florentine youth side in order to take part in the Torneo di Viareggio in 2016, during which he scored a goal in a 1–1 draw against Argentine side Belgrano; the senior side eventually acquired him from Bari on a permanent basis that year for €400,000. After six months with the primavera side, in 2017 he was then sent on loan to Cremonese in Serie B for two seasons in 2017, where he made 53 appearances in total, scoring 5 goals.

In 2019, he returned to Fiorentina, and was included in Vincenzo Montella's first team plans; he went on to make his Serie A debut against Napoli later that year.

International career
Castrovilli made his senior debut for Italy under manager Roberto Mancini, on 15 November 2019, coming on as a late substitute for Lorenzo Insigne in a 3–0 away win over Bosnia and Herzegovina, in a Euro 2020 qualifier. 

Following an injury to Lorenzo Pellegrini, Castrovilli was called-up in June 2021 by Mancini for Italy's UEFA Euro 2020 squad. He made his first and only appearance of the tournament in Italy's final group match, a 1–0 victory against Wales in Rome on 20 June, coming on as a late second-half substitute for Matteo Pessina; the result allowed them to top their group. On 11 July, Castrovilli won the European Championship with Italy following a 3–2 penalty shoot-out victory over England at Wembley Stadium in the final, after a 1–1 draw in extra-time.

Style of play
Castrovilli is a talented and versatile offensive–minded midfielder, with an eye for goal, who is capable of playing as an attacking midfielder or as an offensive–minded central midfielder, known as the mezzala role in Italian football jargon; he has also been deployed as a left winger, a position which allows him to cut onto his stronger right foot and shoot on goal. A fast, elegant, and dynamic player, despite not having a particularly low centre of gravity, he is capable of changing direction quickly, and is also known for his technique, dribbling skills, and use of feints, as well as his ability to exploit spaces and create a numerical advantage for his team when attacking with his late runs from deep. Due to his vision and intelligence, he is often involved in the build-up of attacking plays, although he is also known for his defensive work-rate, tackling, and ability to cover ground.

Career statistics

Club

International

Honours

International
Italy
 UEFA European Championship: 2020

Orders
 5th Class / Knight: Cavaliere Ordine al Merito della Repubblica Italiana: 2021

References

External links

 Profile at the ACF Fiorentina website 
 
 
 Lega Serie A Profile 
 FIGC Profile 

1997 births
Living people
Sportspeople from the Province of Barletta-Andria-Trani
Footballers from Apulia
Italian footballers
Italy youth international footballers
Italy under-21 international footballers
Italy international footballers
Association football midfielders
S.S.C. Bari players
ACF Fiorentina players
U.S. Cremonese players
Serie B players
Serie A players
UEFA Euro 2020 players
UEFA European Championship-winning players
Knights of the Order of Merit of the Italian Republic